Zaida of Seville, c. 1070–1093/1107 (?), was a refugee Muslim princess, formerly associated with the Abbadid dynasty, who became a mistress and then perhaps wife of king Alfonso VI of Castile.

She is said by Al-Andalus sources to have been the daughter-in-law of Al Mutamid, the King of Seville, wife of his son Abu al Fatah al Ma'mun, ruler of the Muslim Taifa of Córdoba, (d. 1091). Later Iberian Christian chroniclers call her Al Mutamid's daughter, but the Islamic chronicles are considered more reliable. With the fall of Seville to the Almoravids, she fled to the protection of Alfonso VI of Castile, becoming his mistress, converting to Catholicism and taking the baptismal name of Isabel.

She was the mother of Alfonso VI of Castile's only son, Sancho, who, though illegitimate, was named his father's heir but was killed in the Battle of Uclés of 1108 during his father's lifetime. It has been suggested that Alfonso's fourth wife, Isabel, was identical to Zaida, but this is still subject to scholarly debate, others making Queen Isabel distinct from the mistress or suggesting that Alfonso had two successive wives of this name, with Zaida being the second Queen Isabel. Alfonso's daughters Elvira and Sancha, were by Queen Isabel, and hence may have been Zaida's.  Queen Isabel is last seen in May 1107.

Zaida is said to have died in childbirth, but it is unclear whether this was at the birth of her known son Sancho in 1093, at the birth of a different child otherwise unknown, or if she is the same as Queen Isabel, in 1107 when she disappears from the historical documentation, perhaps at the birth of whichever was the younger daughter of the queen, Sancha or Elvira. A funerary marker formerly at Sahagun but later moved to Leon bore the inscription:
H.R. Regina Elisabeth, uxor regis Adefonsi, filia Benabet Regis Sevillae, quae prius Zayda, fuit vocata ("Queen Isabel, wife of King Alfonso, daughter of Aben-abeth, king of Seville; previously called Zayda.")
A second inscription memorializes Queen Isabel, making her daughter of Louis, King of France, although there was no French king named Louis in the generation prior to Queen Isabel. Neither memorial is contemporary and neither is generally viewed as credible.

Notes

References 
 
 
 
 
 
 
 
 
 
 
 

Deaths in childbirth
11th-century people from al-Andalus
Spanish Roman Catholics
Converts to Roman Catholicism from Islam
Spanish former Muslims
Burials in the Royal Pantheon at the Basilica of San Isidoro
Women from al-Andalus